KRI Teluk Kupang (519) is the second  of the Indonesian Navy.

Characteristics
She has a capacity of 478 passengers, including her crew of 109 and a helicopter crew of 6, in addition to ten Leopard main battle tanks or ten BMP-3F infantry fighting vehicles and one PT-76 amphibious tank. Teluk Kupang also has a helipad with hangar and capable of carrying a Bell 412 helicopter.

Service history
KRI Teluk Kupang was built by an Indonesian state-owned shipbuilder PT Dok & Perkapalan Kodja Bahari (Persero) (also called DKB), Jakarta. The ship was ordered in 2012, based on AT-117M design that would become the Teluk Bintuni-class ships. Her building process was ceremonially begun with the first steel-cutting on 31 July 2012, and she was assigned with yard number of AT-2.

Due of internal problems faced by the shipbuilder, her construction was delayed. She was finally launched on 17 January 2017 in a ceremony at DKB dockyard in North Jakarta. She was transferred to the Navy and commissioned on 7 December 2020, with Sea Lieutenant Colonel Suryai as her first commanding officer.

References

2017 ships
Teluk Bintuni-class tank landing ships
Amphibious warfare vessels of the Indonesian Navy